XerxesDZB is a Dutch football club based in Rotterdam.

History
The club was founded in 1904 as RFC Xerxes and their first regional championship was won in 1907. After a second championship in 1911 the club was promoted to the second class (tweede klasse) of Dutch football. In 1931 Xerxes became champions of their district and were promoted to the first class (eerste klasse) where they faced teams like Feijenoord, Sparta, ADO, Ajax and Blauw Wit.

While playing at the highest level of Dutch football Xerxes was easily able to remain in their division with players like Wim Lagendaal, and in later years Faas Wilkes and Coen Moulijn and play alongside the giant teams in the country, also during the first years of professional football in the country. However, after 1958 the results became worse and in 1960 Xerxes was forced relegated out of the professional football divisions. Two years in a row (1961 and 1962) Xerxes became champion of the amateurs and was admitted back into professional football for the 1962-63 season.

Times changed and Xerxes promoted to the Eerste Divisie in 1965, followed by another promotion in 1966 to the Eredivisie. At this level Xerxes was again able to achieve decent results with players like Willem van Hanegem, Hans Dorjee, Rob Jacobs and Eddy Treytel. However the lack of an own stadium (a hospital was built on their ground) and withdrawal of the sponsor caused the pro-section of Xerxes was forced to merge with the pro-section DHC Delft during the summer of 1967 to become Xerxex/DHC'66. That club was dissolved already a year later by lack of interest by the fans in Delft.

The amateurs of Xerxes were to begin in the fourth class (vierde klasse) of amateur football. In 1969 the championship of the fourth class was won, as well as promotion to the third class. A year later the championship of the third class was won and they were promoted to the second class. Yet another year later (1971) another championship and promotion to the first class was achieved. The fourth successive championship was won in the first class in 1972. In 1974 the Hoofdklasse (a level above the first class) was introduced, but Xerxers failed to qualify. In 1976 another championship in the first class got them to the Hoofdklasse and in 1980 they were champions of the Hoofdklasse A and by beating the Hoofdklasse B and Hoofdklasse C champions in a separate competition they were amateur champions of the Netherlands as well.

In the last part of the 1990s Xerxes came into financial trouble, and confronted with the fact that they had to leave their grounds again (this time for a railway) and was forced to merge with DZB Zevenkamp resulting in their current name XerxesDZB from 1 July 2000. A big success in the past season when the club (Saturday) promoted to the Hoofdklasse. This is the second amateur level in the Netherlands. The Sunday part of the club is currently playing in the 4rd class level due to a forced relegation by the KNVB. The biggest success of the Sunday part reached the KNVB-Cup in 2008/2009. After six seasons in the Hoofdklasse Xerxes was contracted back to the first class.

Managers
 Friedrich Donnenfeld (1953–55)
 Toon van der Enden
 Jan Bens (1960–62)
 Jiří Hanke (1962–63)
 Bob Janse (1963–66)
 Kurt Linder (1966–68)
 Pim Visser (1971–74)
 Hans Dorjee (1974–76)
 Sándor Popovics (1976–77)
 Bep van der Heyden (1977-xx)

References

External links

 

Football clubs in the Netherlands
Football clubs in Rotterdam
Association football clubs established in 1904
1904 establishments in the Netherlands